Ulanhot Yilelite Airport is an airport in Ulanhot, Inner Mongolia, China .

Airlines and destinations

See also
List of airports in China

References

Airports in Inner Mongolia
Airports established in 1995
1995 establishments in China